Yandi may refer to:

 Yandi, Achkhoy-Martanovsky District, a rural locality in Chechnya
 Yan Emperor, aka Yán Dì, ancient Chinese ruler
 Yandi Munawar (born 1992), Indonesian footballer
 Yandi mine, iron ore mine in Western Australia
 Yandicoogina mine, iron ore mine in Western Australia
 Yandhi, announced 2019 album by Kanye West